The 2013–14 Cleveland State Vikings men's basketball team represented Cleveland State University in the 2013–14 NCAA Division I men's basketball season. Their head coach was Gary Waters. The Vikings played their home games at the Wolstein Center and were members of the Horizon League. It was the 83rd season of Cleveland State basketball. They finished the season 21–12, 12–4 in Horizon League play to finish in second place. They lost in the semifinals of the Horizon League tournament to Wright State. They were invited to the CollegeInsider.com Tournament where they lost in the first round to Ohio.

Roster

Schedule

|-
!colspan=12 style="background:#003300; color:#FFFFFF;"| Exhibition

|-
!colspan=12 style="background:#003300; color:#FFFFFF;"| Regular season

|-
!colspan=12 style="background:#003300; color:#FFFFFF;"| Horizon League tournament

|-
!colspan=12 style="background:#003300; color:#FFFFFF;"| CIT

References

Cleveland State Vikings Men's
Cleveland State Vikings men's basketball seasons
Cleveland State
Viking
Viking